Citizen Bike is a manufacturer of folding bicycles, based on a philosophy of affordability.

Its line of low-cost bicycles are shipped directly to customers and do not require any assembly.

These bicycles fold to a size comparable to other brands but are generally heavier.

The compact size of Citizen folding bikes makes them well suited for urban commuting,

and they are airplane friendly when packed in an optional carrying bag.

An early limited edition model called MTA MetroBike, outfitted with reflective Metropolitan Transportation Authority route symbols,

was showcased by the MTA as a train and bus-friendly bicycle.

The company offers a namesake mobile app to help map rides and count calories.

Models
Models are named after real or fictional cities.

 Milan
 Tokyo
 Miami
 Seoul
 Rome
 Gotham 7
 Gotham 3
 Gotham 24-7	
 Barcelona
 Lil London (electric)
 London (electric)

References

External links
 
 
 

Folding bicycles
Cycle manufacturers of the United States